Victoria Duval was the defending champion, but was still recovering after being diagnosed with Hodgkin's Lymphoma in July.

Gabriela Dabrowski won the title, defeating Maria Sanchez in the final, 6–4, 2–6, 7–6(9–7).

Seeds

Main draw

Finals

Top half

Bottom half

References 
 Main draw

Tevlin Women's Challenger
Tevlin Women's Challenger